The Airfer Bimax is a Spanish paramotor that was designed and produced by Airfer of Pontevedra for powered paragliding. Now out of production, when it was available the aircraft was supplied complete and ready-to-fly.

Design and development
The Bimax was designed as an aircraft for large pilots for two-place flying, to comply with the US FAR 103 Ultralight Vehicles rules as well as European regulations. It features a paraglider-style wing, single-place or two-place-in-tandem accommodation and a single Cors'Air M21Y  engine in pusher configuration with a 2.6:1 ratio reduction drive and a  diameter two-bladed composite propeller. The aircraft is built from a combination of aluminium tubing, with a titanium chassis.

As is the case with all paramotors, take-off and landing is accomplished by foot. Inflight steering is accomplished via handles that actuate the canopy brakes, creating roll and yaw.

Specifications (Bimax)

References

Bimax
2000s Spanish ultralight aircraft
Single-engined pusher aircraft
Paramotors